William T. Gross (born 1958) is an American businessman.

Early life 
Gross grew up in Encino, California and graduated with a Bachelor of Science in mechanical engineering from the California Institute of Technology.

Career 
He founded GNP Loudspeakers (now GNP Audio Video), an audio equipment manufacturer; Starship Video, a video arcade, GNP Development Inc., acquired by Lotus Software; Knowledge Adventure, an educational software company, later acquired by Cendant; and the business incubator Idealab in March, 1996, of which he serves as Chairman of the Board and Chief Executive Officer.

Gross serves on the boards of numerous companies. He is a member of the Board of Trustees of the California Institute of Technology and of the Art Center College of Design.

One company founded by Gross, GoTo.com, Inc., provided an Internet search engine which relied upon sponsored search results and pay-per-click advertisements. GoTo.com was later renamed Overture Services Inc. and was then acquired by Yahoo! to provide their Yahoo! Search Marketing products.

In 1996, Gross purchased the domain name answers.com, which was later sold to NetShepard and then to GuruNet.

In 2004, Gross created the SNAP search engine which introduced a new hyperlink previewer, Snap Shots.

In 2010, Gross founded and launched TweetUp, a search engine for Twitter that promotes the best tweeters on any topic. TweetUp was renamed to "PostUp" to reflect its inclusion of Facebook and LinkedIn status updates.

On January 24, 2011, PostUp acquired popular Twitter client app UberTwitter—after previously purchasing Echofon (for iPhone/iOS) and Twidroyd (for Android OS)—and renamed itself UberMedia.

Solar energy
A Gross company, Energy Innovations, is working on development of a rooftop concentrated photovoltaic solar collector for flat-roofed commercial buildings. They completed the world's largest corporate solar installation at Google's headquarters in 2006.

During 2010, Gross was the CEO of eSolar, a company that aims to make renewable energy cost-competitive with fossil fuel energy using CSP technology. eSolar builds an individual 46 MW power unit on 200 acres and can scale up to 500 MW or larger capacity with multiple units.

Gross also founded Heliogen, a clean energy company backed by Bill Gates. The company has discovered a way to use artificial intelligence and a field of mirrors to reflect so much sunlight that it generates extreme heat above 1,000 degrees Celsius.

References

External links
 
 "A solar energy system that tracks the sun" (TED2003)
 "The single biggest reason why start-ups succeed" (TED2015)

1958 births
Living people
American computer businesspeople
American technology chief executives
American technology company founders
Businesspeople in information technology
California Institute of Technology trustees
California Institute of Technology alumni
Businesspeople from Los Angeles